Euglandina daudebarti is a species of large predatory air-breathing land snail, a terrestrial pulmonate gastropod mollusk in the family Spiraxidae.

Subspecies 
 Euglandina daudebarti daudebarti (Deshayes, 1850)
 Euglandina daudebarti amoena (Von Martens, 1865)
 Euglandina daudebarti jalapana (Von Martens, 1891)
 Euglandina daudebarti miradorensis (Strebel, 1878)

References

Spiraxidae
Gastropods described in 1850